Dracontomelon costatum is a tree in the cashew and sumac family Anacardiaceae. The specific epithet  is from the Latin meaning "ribbed", referring to the leaf veins.

Description
Its bark is cracking in appearance. The flowers are pale yellow.

Distribution and habitat
Dracontomelon costatum grows naturally in Sumatra and Borneo. Its habitat is lowland forests.

References

costatum
Trees of Sumatra
Trees of Borneo